Ewald Straesser (Sträßer) (27 June 1867 – 4 April 1933) was a German composer.

Straesser was born in Burscheid, near Cologne. He was a student of Franz Wüllner at the Hochschule für Musik und Tanz Köln and later counted Georg van Albrecht among his own students, also Erwin Schulhoff (teaching him instrumentation/orchestration) At the Hochschule he succeeded Joseph Haas as professor of composition in 1921.

He died in 1933 in Stuttgart.  Wilhelm Furtwängler, Hermann Abendroth and other conductors and ensembles featured works by Straesser in their concerts. The conductor Karl Panzner (1866–1923) championed Straesser's symphonies early on (and premiered his 5th symphony.)

Major works by Straesser include:
5 string quartets (Nos. 1 and 2, pub. 1901 ; no.3, pub.1913; no.4, published 1920; no.5, pub.1927)
other chamber works (including a piano sonata (Kleine sonate), violin sonata, piano quintet, clarinet quintet and piano trio)
6 symphonies (at least 3 unpublished)
concertos for piano, violin, and cello (1901, UK premiere 1903)(This last possibly lost. The piano concerto has been broadcast.)

There is an Ewald-Sträßer-Weg (Way/Street) in Burscheid.

References

External links
 Includes CC recordings of all five quartets and a more nearly complete list of works

RISM has incipits and other information for Straesser's 2nd and 4th symphonies and one choral work (but gives opus 44 for symphony 4 while other sources give opus 46. Clearly the same work, however- symphony in G minor, unpublished)

1867 births
1933 deaths
German Romantic composers
People from Burscheid
Hochschule für Musik und Tanz Köln alumni
German male classical composers
20th-century German male musicians
19th-century German male musicians